The boxing tournaments at the 2012 Olympic Games in London were held from 28 July to 12 August at the ExCeL Exhibition Centre.

A total of 286 competitors took part in 13 events. For the first time at an Olympic Games, women competed in three boxing events. The first Olympic gold medal in women's boxing was awarded to Nicola Adams from Great Britain, who won the flyweight tournament on 9 August 2012.

Competition format
Men competed in the following ten events: 

Women's boxing was included in the Olympic programme for the first time, with female boxers able to participate in three events:

Qualifying criteria

Each National Olympic Committee was permitted to enter up to one athlete in each event. Nine places were reserved for the host nation, Great Britain, from which it chose up to six (five male and one female), while the remaining places were allocated to the Tripartite Invitation Commission. For each athlete from the host nation who qualified through the World Amateur Boxing Championships, the host lost a guaranteed place. Each continent had a quota of places to be filled through the two championships. Asia had 56 spots, the Americas 54, Africa 52, Europe 78 and Oceania 10.

Qualification events were:
2011 World Amateur Boxing Championships – Baku, Azerbaijan, 16 September – 1 October, in which 10 athletes for all categories, six athletes for the heavyweight and super heavyweight categories qualified for the Olympics.
2012 AIBA Women's World Boxing Championships – Qinhuangdao, China, 9–22 May 2012
Continental Olympic qualifying events during 2012

Competition schedule

There will be two sessions of competition on most days of the 2012 Olympics Boxing program, an afternoon session (A), which will start at 13:30 BST (except for 9 August when it will start at 16:30 BST), and an evening session (E), starting at 20:30 BST.

Medalists

Men

Women

Medal summary

Medal table

Events and concerns

Alleged gold medal fixing

In September 2011, the BBC Newsnight programme uncovered evidence that $9 million (£5.9 million) worth of secret payments were paid to World Series Boxing (WSB), a subcompany of the International Boxing Association (AIBA), by Azerbaijan in return for two gold medals. The AIBA denied the allegations, stating that the secret payments were a loan from an Azerbaijani investor. The AIBA and the International Olympic Committee both started inquiries into the allegations. Subsequently the AIBA rejected any allegations of corruption, stating “Any suggestion that the loan was made in return for promises of gold medals at the 2012 Olympics is preposterous and utterly untrue".

Refereeing
There were several events in boxing in the 2012 Summer Olympics:

References

External links 

 
 
 

 
2012
2012 Summer Olympics events
2012 in boxing
International boxing competitions hosted by the United Kingdom